West Lafayette Junior-Senior High School (also informally known as West Side High School or simply West Side) is the only high school within the West Lafayette city limits, and is administered by the West Lafayette Community School Corporation.

West Lafayette Junior-Senior High School was constructed in 1939 of cream brick and glass at a cost of $225,000, and was remodeled in the late 1990s. The school is located near Purdue University, and the children of many Purdue faculty and staff attend West Side. In 2012, the school was ranked as the 2nd and 4th best public high school in Indiana by U.S. News & World Report and Newsweek, respectively.  As of 2021, the high school was ranked in U.S. News & World Report as 2nd in Indiana and 239th nationwide.

Athletics
The school offers athletic programs including football, baseball, basketball, cheerleading, cross country, soccer, wrestling, golf, track and field, swimming, tennis and volleyball. The teams play under the nickname of the Red Devils and belong to the Hoosier Athletic Conference. The West Lafayette football team won Indiana high school state football championships in Class 2A in 1993, and in Class 3A in 2009 and 2018. Other state championships include the 1964 and 2014 boys cross country, 1998 girls Class 3A basketball, and 2013 girls soccer titles.

Notable alumni

Sonia Y. Angell (Class of 1983), public health leader
Katie Bouman (Class of 2007), imaging scientist
Greg Christopher (Class of 1984), athletic director
Neil Eggleston (Class of 1971), White House Counsel
Paul Eremenko (Class of 1997), innovator and technology executive
Bob Friend (Class of 1949), pitcher for the Pittsburgh Pirates
Gen Fukunaga (Class of 1979), founder of Funimation Entertainment 
George Karlaftis (Class of 2019), NFL football player
Tom Kelly (Class of 1967), songwriter
Jay McDowell (Class of 1987), bassist for country music band BR549
Gavin Mikhail (Class of 1991), singer-songwriter
Sameer Mishra (Class of 2012), won the 81st Scripps National Spelling Bee
Tom Moore (Class of 1961), director
Toby Moskowitz (Class of 1989), financial economist
Chike Okeafor (Class of 1994), NFL football player
Eric Rodwell (Class of 1974), professional bridge player
Carolyn Wood Sherif (Class of 1940), social psychologist
Janet Tobias (Class of 1976), television producer
Randy Truitt (Class of 1986), member of the Indiana House of Representatives

See also
 List of high schools in Indiana

References

External links
 School website
 West Lafayette Community School Corporation
 Indiana Department of Education: School Snapshot

Public high schools in Indiana
West Lafayette, Indiana
Educational institutions established in 1939
Schools in Tippecanoe County, Indiana
Public middle schools in Indiana
1939 establishments in Indiana